Route 5 is a National Road in Bolivia. The road is 898 km long and traverses the Bolivian Altiplano from northeast to southwest, from the Cordillera Oriental. The road crosses the departments of Santa Cruz, Cochabamba, Chuquisaca, and Potosí.

Route 
Route 5 begins in the north-east as a turnoff from Route 7 at La Palizada and ends in the south-west at a village of Hito LX on the Chilean border.

The first 80 kilometres from La Palizada are paved straight, the following 540 kilometres to Uyuni are completely paved. The remaining 260km southwest of Uyuni are unpaved.

Route 5 has been declared part of the Bolivian National Road "Red Vial Fundamental" by Decree 25.134 of 31 August 1998.

References 

Roads in Bolivia